Fernando Rafael García López (born 21 July 1987) is a Peruvian footballer who plays as a striker for Alianza Atlético in the Peruvian First Division.

Club career
García made his professional debut for Juan Aurich in June 2001, aged just 13 (one month before turning 14). This was the world record until Bolivian footballer Mauricio Baldivieso made his debut at age 12. Though according to The Guardian, sources comparing the ages Baldivieso and García are all but verifiable. Fifa lists the, then, 13-year-old Souleymane Mamam as the youngest-ever player in a World Cup qualifying match, supposedly 13 years and 310 days old in May 2001 during a Togo vs Zambia match.

He later played for Universidad San Martín, Alianza Atlético and Sport Boys before returning to Juan Aurich in 2008.

International career
García is former member of the Peru national under-20 football team and presented his team at 2007 South American Youth Championship in Paraguay

References

External links

1987 births
Living people
People from Lambayeque Region
Association football forwards
Peruvian footballers
Juan Aurich footballers
Club Deportivo Universidad de San Martín de Porres players
Alianza Atlético footballers
Sport Boys footballers
León de Huánuco footballers